Jeremy was a left-coiled garden snail investigated by biologists. The snail had a rare condition which caused its shell to coil to the left; in most snails the shell coils to the right. At first it was thought to be a rare genetic mutation, although later work revealed that it was likely due to an accident in early development.

Jeremy was named after the left-wing British Labour politician Jeremy Corbyn, on account of it being a "lefty" snail, but also due to Corbyn's reported love of gardening. The snail became famous worldwide after a public appeal to find other left-coiled snails for a mate. Jeremy had 56 offspring and died on 11 October 2017, aged "at least two" years.

Jeremy was studied by researchers from the University of Nottingham. It was hoped that the condition would be due to a mutation, and that genes identified from this snail and its offspring would help scientists unlock genetic markers in humans and other animals.

Life
A retired scientist found Jeremy in southwest London. He contacted the University of Nottingham and sent them the snail. A group of researchers, led by "resident snail expert" Dr Angus Davison, then launched a public appeal to find another 'lefty' snail as a mate. Due to the unique positioning of the reproductive body parts in anticlockwise-coiled snails, they are only able to mate with snails that also have anticlockwise shells. Two other anticlockwise snails were discovered and sent to the university; however, these two snails mated with each other instead, producing 170 right-coiled 'normal' snails. One of the left-coiled snails later mated with Jeremy, producing 56 offspring, all of which were also 'normal' with right-coiling shells.

It is believed that the genetic mutation might reappear in a later generation due to a recessive gene. In snails, shell-coiling direction is thought to be an example of a maternal effect – a trait that is determined not by an organism's own genotype, but by the genotype of its mother. In this case, Jeremy's mother (who likely possessed a normal, clockwise shell), would have had two copies of the recessive gene, expressed in Jeremy's anticlockwise shell. Jeremy, with only one copy of the gene, would be expected to mother normal snails. This recessive trait may reappear later in another generation, even if a previous generation appears normal, because the mutation is hereditary.

Further research
While studying this snail, Davison discovered a gene that determined whether a snail's shell coiled to the left or to the right. He said that body asymmetry in humans and other animals could be affected by the same gene and that the research could help understand the positioning of organs according to genetic markers.

Davison was quoted as saying:
This may be the end for Jeremy, but now the snail has finally produced offspring, this is a point in our long-term research goal. Ultimately, we would like to know why these snails are so rare, but also how the left and right sides of the body are signalled at the molecular level, and whether a similar process is taking place during human development.

Research was expected to continue on the offspring of these snails, and the University of Nottingham had seven left-coiled snails by October 2017.

In July 2018, the research team at the University of Nottingham announced the arrival of St Stephen, a 'lefty' snail of the species Cepaea nemoralis and stated in a tweet that they were looking for potential mates.

It was hoped that this research will lead to insights into rare conditions like situs inversus and situs ambiguus where the positioning of organs in the body is reversed or misplaced due to genetic malformations.

Sinistral snails
Jeremy was an example of a rare sinistral snail in a species which normally has right-handed shell-coiling. Such snail kings are individual snails whose shell winds in the opposite direction given the standard for the specific snail species. For instance, in the case of garden snails, snail kings feature sinistral helices instead of the more common dextral helices; this is referred to as 'situs inversis'. For garden snails, researchers estimate the occurrence frequency of snail kings at 1:40,000 individuals. However, in some other species of snail, the counterclockwise shell-coiling is quite common, and in a few cases counterclockwise shell coiling is the normal direction.

Snail kings may occur after the mating of two dextral helix snails (with the offspring of these snails continuing to be sinistral) and are therefore considered to be a highly illustrative example that heredity patterns are not purely dominant-recessive.

See also
 Land snails
 Mating of gastropods
 Gastropoda
 Terrestrial mollusc
 Gastropod shell

References

External links
 Nottingham University site
 Angus Davison & his lab
 

Gastropods
Jeremy Corbyn
Individual animals in the United Kingdom
2017 animal deaths